Abacetus tenebrioides is a species of ground beetle in the subfamily Pterostichinae. It was described by Castelnau in 1834.

References

tenebrioides
Beetles described in 1834

Taxa named by François-Louis Laporte, comte de Castelnau